Etienne de Poissy  (died 17 October 1373) was a cardinal of the Catholic Church. He was archbishop of Paris, France, and French Chancellor.

He was made cardinal on 22 September 1368 by Pope Urban V.

References 

14th-century French cardinals
Archbishops of Paris
1373 deaths
Year of birth unknown